Henk Lotgering (11 February 1903 – 13 September 1984) was a Dutch diver. He competed at the 1924 Summer Olympics and the 1928 Summer Olympics.

References

External links
 

1903 births
1984 deaths
Dutch male divers
Olympic divers of the Netherlands
Divers at the 1924 Summer Olympics
Divers at the 1928 Summer Olympics
Divers from Amsterdam